The 1936–37 season was Manchester United's 41st season in the Football League.

United finished the season in the 21st place and were relegated to the Second Division. A positive moment early in the season was the home win over neighbours Manchester City, watched by 69,000 in the stadium.

First Division

FA Cup

References

Manchester United F.C. seasons
Manchester United